Fang Fen-fang (born 15 June 1981) is a Taiwanese cyclist. She competed in the women's points race at the 2000 Summer Olympics.

References

1981 births
Living people
Taiwanese female cyclists
Olympic cyclists of Taiwan
Cyclists at the 2000 Summer Olympics
Place of birth missing (living people)
Cyclists at the 1998 Asian Games
Asian Games medalists in cycling
Medalists at the 1998 Asian Games
Asian Games bronze medalists for Chinese Taipei